Vickie Chaudhary (born 17 January 1985), known by his stage name Kuldeep Singh, is an Indian Hindi-language television actor who is best known for playing Lord Vishnu, Rama and Krishna in the mythological TV series Vighnaharta Ganesha and Bharmal in Vikram Betaal Ki Rahasya Gatha. He was also seen as Dr. Vaibhav in the police procedural series CID.

Biography
Kuldeep Singh was born as Vickie Chaudhary on 17 January 1985 in Bahadurgarh, Haryana, India to Satyapal Singh and Shyam Lata. Brought up in Delhi, he completed his B.Com at Ramjas College of Delhi University. His father Satyapal Singh.

He started his acting career with Detective Wagle which aired on DD National. He initially appeared in negative role in several television series including Yeh Hai Aashiqui, Aye Zindagi, Savdhaan India. In 2017, he joined the mythological series Vighnaharta Ganesha which aired on Sony TV, and played Lord Vishnu, Rama, and Krishna. He acted in Vikram Betaal Ki Rahasya Gatha as Bharmal, CID (Indian TV series) as Dr. Vaibhav, Man Mein Hai Visshwas as Anwar, and Pyaar Tune Kya Kiya.

In 2020, Singh made his debut in a digital web series with Gandii Baat (season 4) in which he played Guddu. In July 2020, he was invited to appear in Bigg Boss (season 14), which he declined.

Filmography

Television
2013–2016 – Yeh Hai Aashiqui
2016 – SuperCops vs Supervillains
2016 – Fear Files: Darr Ki Sacchi Tasvirein
2016 – Man Mein Hai Visshwas as Anwar
2014–2015 – CID (Indian TV series) as Dr. Vaibhav
2014–2015 – Kaisi Yeh Yaariaan
2017–2020 – Vighnaharta Ganesha as Lord Vishnu
2018 – Vikram Betaal Ki Rahasya Gatha as Bharmal
2017 – Savdhaan India
2017 – Aye Zindagi as Aman
2016 – Pyaar Tune Kya Kiya

Web series
 2018 – Gandii Baat as Guddu
 2020 – Victim as Karan

References

External links 
 

 Male actors from Haryana
 Living people
 1985 births
 People from Bareilly
 21st-century Indian male actors
 Male actors in Hindi television